Hubert Renfro Knickerbocker (January 31, 1898 – July 12, 1949) was an American journalist and author. He was nicknamed "Red" from the color of his hair.

Early life 
Knickerbocker was born in Yoakum, Texas. Knickerbocker's father was Rev. Hubert Delancey Knickerbocker.

Education 
Knickerbocker graduated from the Southwestern University in Texas and then studied psychiatry at Columbia University.

Career 
Knickerbocker was a journalist, noted for reporting on German politics before and during World War II. From 1923 to 1933 he reported from Berlin, but because of his opposition to Adolf Hitler he was deported when Hitler came to power. On December 1, 1930, Knickerbocker interviewed Soviet leader Stalin's mother, Keke Geladze in Tiflis for the New York Evening Post through a Georgian interpreter. The article was titled “Stalin Mystery Man Even to His Mother.”

In 1932 he travelled across Europe for the book Does Europe Recover. He interviewed many state leaders, amongst them Mussolini, and the second most important person of Germany's NSDAP Party, Gregor Strasser. His report on Italian Fascism is full of praise for the "stability" of the regime. He also praises Strasser's "left wing" of NSDAP party and the Papen government's semi-dictatorship. There is no hint of a warning about Nazism in the book but rather a recommendation for its success in Italy.
Back in America, after Hitler's reign of terror became the face of NSDAP, he began writing about the threat posed by Nazism.  On April 15, 1933, he wrote in the New York Evening Post: "An indeterminate number of Jews have been killed.  Hundreds of Jews have been beaten or tortured.  Thousands of Jews have fled.  Thousands of Jews have been, or will be, deprived of their livelihood." In 1931, as a correspondent for the New York Evening Post and the Philadelphia Public Ledger, he won the Pulitzer Prize for "a series of articles on the practical operation of the Five Year Plan in Russia".

In 1936 he covered the Spanish Civil War for the Hearst Press group. Like other foreign reporters, his work was progressively hampered by the rebel authorities, who finally arrested Knickerbocker in April 1937 and deported him shortly after. Back to the United States, he wrote an article for the Washington Times, published on 10 May 1937, in which he exposed the brutal repression and the "antisemite, misogynist and antidemocratic" society that the Nationalists planned to develop, according to the statements made by Gonzalo de Aguilera, Francoist Foreign Press Liaison Officer at the time. The next day, Congressman Jerry J. O'Connell cited the article extensively in the House of Representatives due to the concern generated.

After World War II, Knickerbocker went to work for radio station WOR, in Newark, New Jersey. He was on assignment with a team of journalists touring Southeast Asia when they were all killed in a plane crash near Bombay, India, on July 12, 1949.

Personal life 
Knickerbocker was married first to Laura Patrick in 1918, and they had one son, Conrad, who became a daily book reviewer for the New York Times. His second marriage was to Agnes Schjoldager, with whom he had three daughters, including Miranda, who married actor Sorrell Booke.

Major publications
Fighting the Red Trade Menace (1931)
The New Russia (1931)
Soviet Trade and World Depression (1931)
The Soviet Five Year Plan and Its Effect on World Trends (1931)
Can Europe Recover? (1932)
The German Crisis (1932)
Germany-Fascist or Soviet? (1932)
The Truth about Hitlerism (1933)
The Boiling Point: Will War Come in Europe? (1934)
Is Tomorrow Hitler’s? 200 Questions On The Battle of Mankind (1941)

References

Further reading
  Cohen, Deborah. Last Call at the Hotel Imperial: The Reporters Who Took On a World at War (2022) American coverage of 1930s in Europe by John Gunther, H. R. Knickerbocker, Vincent Sheean, and Dorothy Thompson.excerpt

External links

 Hubert Renfro Knickerbocker Papers, 1914-1950 at the Columbia University Rare Book and Manuscript Library, New York, NY

Pulitzer Prize for Correspondence winners
1898 births
1949 deaths
Columbia University alumni
Southwestern University alumni
American people of German descent
War correspondents of the Spanish Civil War
Viennese interwar correspondents
Victims of aviation accidents or incidents in India